is a passenger railway station  located in the city of Tottori, Tottori Prefecture, Japan. It is operated by the West Japan Railway Company (JR West).

Lines

Station layout
The station consists of one ground-level side platform serving a single bi-directional track. There is no station building, but only a rain shelter on the platform. The station is unattended.

History
Takagari Station opened on August 1, 1961. With the privatization of the Japan National Railways (JNR) on April 1, 1987, the station came under the aegis of the West Japan Railway Company.

Passenger statistics
In fiscal 2020, the station was used by an average of 38 passengers daily.

Surrounding area
Japan National Route 53
Japan National Route 373
Japan National Route 482

See also
List of railway stations in Japan

References

External links 

 Takagari Station from JR-Odekake.net 

Railway stations in Tottori Prefecture
Stations of West Japan Railway Company
Railway stations in Japan opened in 1961
Tottori (city)